Ottapidaram taluk is a taluk of Thoothukudi district of the Indian state of Tamil Nadu. The headquarters of the taluk is the town of Ottapidaram.

Demographics
According to the 2011 census, the taluk of Ottapidaram had a population of 123,097 with 61,822  males and 61,275 females. There were 991 women for every 1000 men. The taluk had a literacy rate of 73.21. Child population in the age group below 6 was 6,143 Males and 5,876 Females.

References 

Taluks of Thoothukudi district